Malacosoma tigris, the sonoran tent caterpillar, is a species of insect in the moth family Lasiocampidae.

The MONA or Hodges number for Malacosoma tigris is 7700.

References

Further reading

 

Malacosoma
Articles created by Qbugbot
Taxa named by Harrison Gray Dyar Jr.